New Frankfort is an unincorporated community in Saline County, in the U.S. state of Missouri.

History
New Frankfort was originally called Frankfort, and under the latter name was platted in 1858, and named after Frankfurt, in Germany, the native land of a large share of the first settlers. A post office called New Frankfort was established in 1863, and remained in operation until 1907.

References

Unincorporated communities in Saline County, Missouri
Unincorporated communities in Missouri